Human body weight is a person's mass or weight.

Strictly speaking, body weight is the measurement of weight without items located on the person. Practically though, body weight may be measured with clothes on, but without shoes or heavy accessories such as mobile phones and wallets, and using manual or digital weighing scales. Excess or reduced body weight is regarded as an indicator of determining a person's health, with body volume measurement providing an extra dimension by calculating the distribution of body weight.

Estimation in children 

There are a number of methods to estimate weight in children for circumstances (such as emergencies) when actual weight cannot be measured. Most involve a parent or health care provider guessing the child's weight through weight-estimation formulas. These formulas base their findings on the child's age and tape-based systems of weight estimation. Of the many formulas that have been used for estimating body weight, some include the Advanced Pediatric Life Support formula, the Leffler formula, and Theron formula. There are also several types of tape-based systems for estimating children's weight, with the most well-known being the Broselow tape. The Broselow tape is based on length with weight read from the appropriate color area. Newer systems, such as the PAWPER tape, make use of a simple two-step process to estimate weight: the length-based weight estimation is modified according to the child's body habitus to increase the accuracy of the final weight prediction.

The Leffler formula is used for children 0–10 years of age.  In those less than a year old, it is

and for those 1–10 years old, it is

where m is the number of kilograms the child weighs and am and ay respectively are the number of months or years old the child is.

The Theron formula is

where m and ay are as above.

Fluctuation 
Body weight varies throughout the day, as the amount of water in the body is not constant. It changes frequently due to activities such as drinking, urinating, or exercise. Professional sports participants may deliberately dehydrate themselves to enter a lower weight class, a practice known as weight cutting.

Ideal body weight
Ideal body weight (IBW) was initially introduced by Ben J. Devine in 1974 to allow estimation of drug clearances in obese patients; researchers have since shown that the metabolism of certain drugs relates more to IBW than total body weight. The term was based on the use of insurance data that demonstrated the relative mortality for males and females according to different height-weight combinations.

The most common estimation of IBW is by the Devine formula; other models exist and have been noted to give similar results. Other methods used in estimating the ideal body weight are body mass index and the Hamwi method. The IBW is not the perfect fat measurement, as it does not show the fat or muscle percentage in one's body. For example, athletes' results may show that they are overweight when they are actually very fit and healthy. Machines like the dual-energy X-ray absorptiometry can accurately measure the percentage and weight of fat, muscle, and bone in a body.

Devine formula
The Devine formula for calculating ideal body weight in adults is as follows:
 Male ideal body weight =  +  × (height (cm) − 152)
 Female ideal body weight =  +  × (height (cm) − 152)

Hamwi method
The Hamwi method is used to calculate the ideal body weight of the general adult:
 Male ideal body weight =  +  × (height (cm) − 152)
 Female ideal body weight =  +  × (height (cm) − 152)

Usage

Sports
Participants in sports such as boxing, mixed martial arts, wrestling, rowing, judo, sambo, Olympic weightlifting, and powerlifting are classified according to their body weight, measured in units of mass such as pounds or kilograms. See, e.g., wrestling weight classes, boxing weight classes, judo at the 2004 Summer Olympics, and boxing at the 2004 Summer Olympics.

Medicine
Ideal body weight, specifically the Devine formula, is used clinically for multiple reasons, most commonly in estimating renal function in drug dosing, and predicting pharmacokinetics in morbidly obese patients.

Average weight around the world

By region

Data from 2005:

By country

Global statistics
Researchers at the London School of Hygiene and Tropical Medicine published a study of average weights of adult humans in the journal BMC Public Health and at the United Nations conference Rio+20.

See also 

 Anthropometry
 Bergmann's rule
 Birth weight
 Body mass index (BMI)
 Classification of obesity
 Emaciation
 Hesse's Rule
 History of anthropometry
 Human height
 List of heaviest people
 Obesity
 Overweight
 Set point theory
 
 Thermoregulation in humans
 Underweight
 Weight loss and weight gain
 Weight phobia

References

External links
 
 Online calculator for Hamwi method

 
Auxology
Anthropometry
Mathematics in medicine